The political culture of the United Kingdom was described by the political scientists Gabriel Almond and Sidney Verba (1963) as a deferential civic culture. In the United Kingdom, factors such as class and regionalism and the nation's history such as the legacy of the British Empire impact on political culture.

Factors which have shaped British political culture
Geography: Britain's position as an island nation
Religion: A Christian tradition, and notably a history of confessional clashes beginning in the 16th century and continuing into the 17th, 18th, 19th and 20th century between Calvinists (e.g. Presbyterians), Anglicans, and Roman Catholics.
History: The gradual evolution of the political system rather than revolution.
Sociology: Britain's conversion early on, compared to neighbouring states, away from a rural and agricultural society and into an urban and industrial society.

References

Further reading
Almond, Gabriel A., Verba, Sidney The Civic Culture. Boston, MA: Little, Brown and Company, 1965

Politics of the United Kingdom